Diabolocatantops is a genus of grasshoppers (Caelifera: Acrididae) in the subfamily Catantopinae and tribe Catantopini. Species can be found in Africa, India, China and Indo-China.

Species
The Orthoptera Species File and Catalogue of Life list the following:
Diabolocatantops axillaris Thunberg, 1815 - type species (as Gryllus axillaris Thunberg = D. a. axillaris)
Diabolocatantops consobrinus Karny, 1907
Diabolocatantops innotabilis Walker, 1870
Diabolocatantops pinguis Stål, 1861
Diabolocatantops pulchellus Walker, 1870
Diabolocatantops rufipennis Li & Jin, 1984
Diabolocatantops signatipes Walker, 1870
Diabolocatantops sukhadae Bhowmik, 1986

Gallery

References

External links

Acrididae genera
Catantopinae
Insects of Africa
Insects of Asia